Randy Jackson (born 1956) is an American musician, record producer and former judge on American Idol.

Randy Jackson may also refer to:

Randy Jackson (Jacksons singer) (born 1961), former member of the Jacksons and younger brother of Michael Jackson
Randy Jackson (Zebra) (born 1955), American guitarist and lead singer of the rock band Zebra
Randy Jackson (baseball) (1926–2019), American baseball player of the 1950s
Randy Jackson (offensive lineman) (born 1944), American football player of the 1960s and 1970s
Randy Jackson (running back) (1948–2010), former NFL football player